Rodale may refer to:

 J. I. Rodale (1898–1971), publisher, sustainable agriculture and organic farming advocate
 Maria Rodale (born 1962), daughter of Robert Rodale, CEO and Chairman of Rodale, Inc.
 Rodale, Inc., a publishing company founded by J. I. Rodale
 Rodale Organic Gardening Experimental Farm, an organic farm founded by J. I. Rodale 
 Robert Rodale (1930–1990), son of J. I. Rodale, and head of Rodale, Inc.
 The Rodale Institute, an agricultural research institute founded by J. I. Rodale
 Rodale, a character in the horror comic book mini-series Karney